The Russo-Ukrainian War has seen a significant amount of foreign fighters join both sides of the conflict. It had been estimated prior to the 2022 Russian invasion of Ukraine that there were approximately 17,000 foreign fighters in Ukraine. Foreign fighters have travelled to fight in the conflict for a variety of reasons, such as far-left or far-right ideologues supporting their perceived ideological allies, religious and ethnic affinities, opposition to Russia or the West, and those seeking to do so for "recreational" purposes. Before February 2022, Russia had sought to obscure its direct involvement in the war in Donbas (and initially the annexation of Crimea) by stating its forces were foreign volunteers and unaffiliated with its official military forces.

The launch of the Russian invasion of Ukraine in February 2022 caused a significant increase in the amount of foreign fighters in the conflict. The Ukrainian government announced the establishment of an officially-sanctioned foreign legion two days after it began, which had received alleged endorsement from some Western governments after ambiguous statements from officials. The Belarusian Kastuś Kalinoŭski Regiment is one of the largest such units on the Ukrainian side.

Russian president Vladimir Putin publicly welcomed fighters from abroad to join his forces. Most foreigners arriving to fight for Russia are enlisted in the Prizrak Brigade.

Russian side

Post-Soviet countries
A significant number of foreign fighters from the former Soviet Union have fought in Russo-Ukrainian War for the pro-Russian side. These have included fighters from Armenia, Belarus, Kazakhstan, Kyrgyzstan, and Latvia, as well as from pro-Russian breakaway regions such as Abkhazia, South Ossetia and Transnistria. Some have fought as volunteers due to being members of Russian diaspora or ideological reasons, while others are mercenaries allegedly hired by the Russian government.

Russian Federation
Prior to its open involvement in 2022, especially during the first peak of the war in Donbas between 2014 and 2015, Russia had previously tried to deny any formal intervention in Ukraine and portrayed Russian forces in the country as either part of local forces or Russian citizens voluntarily fighting in the country. These units have been referred as "little green men" by Western and Ukrainian media and as "polite people" by Russian media. The Russian government-supported private military company Wagner Group, largely composed of former Soviet, Eastern European and Syrian soldiers, is deployed in Ukraine to secure Russian interests while maintaining the deniability of formal Russian involvement.

Outside of Russian forces which have been described as volunteers or unrelated to the Russian government to maintain deniability, various Russian individuals and groups have joined separatist forces in Donbas. These have included Cossacks, the pro-Putin National Liberation Movement, the neo-Nazi Russian National Unity, the National Bolshevik Other Russia party and left-wing activists. Non-Slavic ethnic minorities have been among the foreign fighters, including North Ossetians, Ingush, and Chechens.

Fighters from other countries
Most foreign fighters from countries outside the former Soviet Union are from Europe. According to a report by Polish security expert Kacper Rękawek for the Polish Institute of International Affairs published in 2015, around a hundred Germans, a hundred Serbs, and thirty Hungarians are fighting for pro-Russian forces in Donbas.

Serbian foreign fighters
A significant amount of Serbian citizens and ethnic Serbs from neighbouring countries such as Bosnia (specifically the autonomous Republika Srpska) and Montenegro have joined to fight for pro-Russian forces in Donbas, having been described by external observers and the DPR/LPR authorities as one of the largest components of foreign fighters. Many of the Serb fighters are veterans of the Yugoslav Wars. Serbian units within the pro-Russian forces include the International Brigade, Seventh Brigade, Serbian-Hussar Regiment, Ural Unit, First Slavic Unit, Batman Unit, Rezanj Unit and the Jovan Šević Detachment.

Historical links with Russia, pan-Slavism and religious affinity have been regarded as a major factor in Serbs joining the pro-Russian forces, although many are mercenaries. Many of the fighters are affiliated with the Chetniks, a far-right Serbian nationalist movement.

Far-left volunteers
Left-wing volunteers have gone to fight for the pro-Russian forces, accusing the Ukrainian government of being a "fascist state" and seeking to engage in an "anti-fascist struggle". However, these leftist volunteers have co-operated with far-right groups in Donbas. Among the initial volunteers were members of the Communist Party of Ukraine, as well as some members of trade unions and labor organizations opposed to the new government that emerged after the Ukrainian Revolution.

A small number of Spanish socialists travelled to Ukraine to fight for the separatists, with some explaining they were "repaying the favour" to Russia for the USSR's support to Republicans during the Spanish Civil War. They were also enlisting in solidarity with those who died in the Unions House fire. Spanish fighters established the 'Carlos Palomino International Brigade', which fought under the flag of the Second Spanish Republic. In 2015, it reportedly had less than ten members. Other examples include the 'DKO' (Volunteer Communist Unit) and the Interunit, both composed of foreign communist volunteers.

Latvian communist of Ugandan and Russian descent Beness Aijo was arrested in Donetsk in 2014 for fighting with separatist forces and the National Bolshevik Interbrigades. A female member of the Israeli Communist Party had also reportedly gone to fight for the separatists in 2015.

Far-right volunteers
Far-right foreign fighters from Europe and to a lesser extent North America have fought alongside the pro-Russian separatists in Donbas, including white nationalists, neo-Nazis, fascists and Christian extremists. Motivations for these fighters have included the belief that they are fighting America and Western interests and that Vladimir Putin is a bulwark for traditional white European values who they must support against the decadent West.

One notable far-right group is the French organisation Continental Unity, which has been accused of recruiting far-right extremists across Europe to come and fight in Donbas. Other far-right groups include the Bulgarian nationalist Orthodox Dawn Battalion and the Hungarian nationalist Legion of Saint Istvan.

Finnish far-right and neo-Nazi groups have been recruited for the Donbas war by Johan Bäckman and Janus Putkonen who are aligned with the local pro-Russian party.

Middle Eastern and African volunteers and mercenaries
Following its 2022 offensive, US and Ukrainian intelligence have alleged that Russia has sought to hire and already deployed fighters from forces it supports in places such as Syria, Libya and the Central African Republic under the command of the Wagner Group private military forces. Fighters have reportedly included those from the pro-Syrian government National Defence Forces, Central African Union of Peace and the pro-Khalifa Haftar Libyan National Army. The Libyan National Army denied any of its fighters were fighting for Russia in Ukraine.

The Iran-aligned Lebanese political party Hezbollah denied sending fighters to Ukraine after the General Staff of the Ukrainian Armed Forces accused some of their members of being among 1,000 Syrian mercenaries allegedly hired to fight in Ukraine.

Turkish media and Russian-American journalist Vera Mironova alleged that members of the Kurdistan Workers' Party and the People's Defense Units (both affiliated with the Kurdistan Communities Union) were fighting as mercenaries for Russian forces.

On October 4, the Syrian Observatory for Human Rights reported that 5 Syrian Arab Army soldiers of the 25th Special Mission Forces Division had been killed fighting for Russia during the 2022 Ukrainian southern counteroffensive.

In January 2023, the Syrian Observatory for Human Rights reported that just under 2000 soldiers of the Syrian Arab Army, specifically the 25th Special Mission Forces Division, had been deployed to fight on behalf of Russia in Ukraine. The SOHR had obtained a document allegedly from the Syrian Government, explaining the Syrian Army's budget and salaries affecting Syrian soldiers in Ukraine.

It was widely reported in October 2022 that the Wagner Group had attempted to recruit former members of the American-trained Afghan National Army Commando Corps which became defuct after the victory of the Taliban insurgency in August 2021.

Foreign expatriates in Russia
A number of African students or former students are known to have been recruited for military service on the Russian side. Jean-Claude Sangwa, a student from the Democratic Republic of the Congo (DRC) who had formerly studied in Rostov, was reported to have enlisted in Luhansk People's Militia in late 2021 alongside two other expatriates from the DRC or Central African Republic.

A number of other African former students are known to have been recruited by the Wagner Group after receiving criminal convictions while in Russia. Lemekani Nathan Nyirenda, a Zambian former student at the Moscow Engineering Physics Institute who had been sentenced to a nine-and-a-half year jail term, was killed while fighting for the Wagner Group in September 2022. Nemes Tarimo, a Tanzanian former student at Moscow Technological University who had previously received a seven-year jail term, was killed in similar circumstances in October 2022.

Ukrainian side

Post-Soviet countries
Similarly to their opponents, many foreign fighters from the former Soviet Union have fought in the Russo-Ukrainian War for the Ukrainian side. These have included fighters from Armenia, Azerbaijan, the Baltic states, Belarus and Georgia. Exiled Chechens opposed to Ramzan Kadyrov and some Russian dissidents have also taken up arms on behalf of the Ukrainians.

Belarus
The main Belarusian units fighting alongside Ukraine are the Kastuś Kalinoŭski Regiment and the Pahonia Regiment.

Fighters from other countries
Ajnad al-Kavkaz, a group of Chechen foreign fighters which fights on the side of the Syrian opposition, which is  fighting the Russian government in the Syrian civil war, deployed some fighters to fight for the Ukrainian side.  Like other Chechen foreign fighter groups across the world, they are motivated by anti-Russian sentiment stemming from the Chechnyan Conflict.

A report from the Russian Military of Defence in June 2022 claimed that 38 Nigerian and four Senegalese citizens had been killed while fighting for the Ukrainian side.

International Legion

Three days after the beginning of the Russian invasion in 2022, Ukrainian President Zelenskyy announced the establishment of the International Legion.

List of notable expatriate units in Ukraine

Pro-Russian units
 Carlos Palomino International Brigade
 Chetniks
 Interbrigades
 Interunit
 Legion of Saint Istvan
 Continental Unit
 Volunteer Communist Detachment 
 Pizrak Brigade (Unofficially, attracts large amounts of foreign volunteers)
 Vostok Brigade

Pro-Ukrainian units
 Dzhokhar Dudayev Battalion
 Freedom of Russia Legion
 Georgian National Legion
 International Legion of Territorial Defense of Ukraine
 Kastuś Kalinoŭski Regiment
 Misanthropic Division
 Sheikh Mansur Battalion
 Tactical group "Belarus"
 Ajnad al-Kavkaz
 Croatian Defence Forces
 Norman Brigade
 Pahonia Regiment
 Russian Volunteer Corps
 Ichkerian Special Purpose Battalion
 Tactical group "Belarus"
 Russian Insurgent Army

Notable people

 Beness Aijo, Latvian Nazbol of Russian and Ugandan descent who was arrested and deported from Ukraine for fighting with the Interbrigades in 2014. He later returned to Ukraine to fight for the Donetsk People's Republic.
 Dejan Berić, Serbian sniper in the armed forces of the DNR.
 Trevor Cadieu, a three star Canadian general, possibly captured in June 2022.
 Sandra Andersen Eira, Norwegian Sámi member of the Sámi Parliament of Norway (2017–2021) who joined the Ukrainian International Legion.
 Aleko Elisashvili, Georgian parliamentarian who joined the Ukrainian International Legion.
 Mamuka Mamulashvili, Georgian paramilitary leader and former soldier who leads the Georgian National Legion.
 Isa Munayev, Chechen rebel who led the Dzhokhar Dudayev Battalion before his death at the Battle of Debaltseve in 2015.
 Malcolm Nance, American author, media pundit, and former US Navy Senior Chief Petty Officer who joined the Ukrainian International Legion.
 Shaun Pinner, former British soldier who joined the Ukrainian Army as a volunteer and was captured and sentenced to death by the authorities of the Donetsk People's Republic.
 Tseng Sheng-guang, Taiwanese indigenous veteran who volunteered in the Ukrainian International Legion and the Carpathian Sich Battalion, was the first East Asian soldier killed in action.
 Pavel Shurmei, Belarusian Olympic rower who joined the pro-Ukrainian Belarusian Kalinoŭski Regiment.
 Aliaksiej Skoblia, Belarusian dissident who defected to Ukraine in 2015 and currently leads the Kalinoŭski Regiment.
 Yulia Tolopa, Russian-born woman fighting on the side of Ukraine from 2014-2019
 Russell Bentley, a former American soldier and communist who fought with Russian sepertatists in 2014 and returned in 2022 with the expressd intention of helping Russian forces.

See also
 Ukrainian volunteer battalions
 Foreign fighters in the Syrian Civil War and War in Iraq

Bibliography

References

Russo-Ukrainian War
Expatriate military units and formations
Mercenary warfare